Telson is a genus of cyclopoid copepods in the family Telsidae. There are at least two described species in Telson.

Species
These two species belong to the genus Telson:
 Telson elongatus Pearse, 1952
 Telson nicholsi Causey, 1960

References

Cyclopoida